Murari Lal Meena (born 20 July 1960) is an Indian politician, member of Rajasthan Legislative Assembly from Dausa Constituency. Meena had fielded his wife as a Congress candidate against Jaskaur Meena, the BJP candidate from Dausa in the Seventeenth Lok Sabha elections of India. Meena is considered a supporter of Sachin Pilot. He is a former minister in Rajasthan government (2008-2013). He lost 2013 Rajasthan assembly election from Dausa. He is the Minister of State in the present Rajasthan Government.

References 

Living people
Indian National Congress politicians from Rajasthan
1960 births
Rajasthan MLAs 2018–2023